On May 5, 1983, a Lockheed L-1011 TriStar, registration N334EA, operating as Eastern Air Lines Flight 855 en route from Miami International Airport to Nassau International Airport, experienced the loss of all three engines near Miami, Florida. The flight crew succeeded in restarting one engine in time to safely land the aircraft at Miami International Airport.

Aircraft
The incident aircraft was a Lockheed L-1011 TriStar 1, registration N334EA, msn 1141. The aircraft had been manufactured in 1976. It was powered by three Rolls-Royce RB211-22B turbofan engines.

Background
On May 4, N334EA had flown into Miami where it underwent overnight maintenance, which included a check of the magnetic chip detectors inside the jet engines. This involved removing the master chip detector from each engine and replacing it with a new one. Each chip detector had two O-rings, which served as oil seals. The replacement chip detectors were not fitted with O-rings, a fact which was not noticed by the mechanic who fitted them. After the chip detectors were fitted, each engine was motored for 10 seconds to check for oil leaks. None were found. The aircraft was signed off as serviceable and returned to service.

Incident
Eastern Air Lines Flight 855 took off from Miami International Airport at 08:56 on a flight to Nassau International Airport in the Bahamas carrying 162 passengers and 10 crew. On board was a veteran flight crew, consisting of Captain Richard Boddy (58), Captain Steve Thompson (48) and Flight Engineer Dudley Barnes (44). Captain Boddy had more than 12,000 hours of total flying experience, although he was new to the L-1011, having logged just 13 hours in the aircraft type. On this flight, Captain Thompson served as a supervisory check airman. He had accrued close to 17,000 flight hours throughout his career, with 282 hours in the L-1011. Flight Engineer Barnes had more than 9,000 hours of total flying time, with 2,666 hours clocked in the L-1011 cockpit.

At 09:15, while descending through , the low oil pressure indicator on the TriStar's number 2 engine illuminated. The flight engineer noted that the oil pressure on the #2 engine was fluctuating between 15 and 25 psi; the minimum pressure required for normal engine operation was 30 psi. The captain ordered the flight engineer to shut down the engine.

The crew elected to return to Miami to land. Flight 855 received a clearance back to Miami, as well as instructions to begin a climb to FL200 ( nominal altitude).

En route back to Miami, low oil pressure lights for engines #1 and #3 illuminated, and the oil quantity gauges for all three engines read zero. At 09:23, Flight 855 informed Miami ARTCC of the engine gauge readings but stated, "We believe it to be faulty indications since the chance of all three engines having zero oil pressure and zero quantity is almost nil." Five minutes later, the #1 engine flamed out while the crew was attempting to restart the #2 engine. Cabin lights went off and flight deck instruments stopped working. The crew successfully restarted the #2 engine on the third attempt and executed a one-engine landing at Miami at 09:46. After the landing the power from #2 engine was insufficient for the aircraft to taxi; a tug had to be used to tow it to the airport terminal, where the occupants disembarked normally. None of the 172 passengers and crew aboard were injured in the incident.

Cause
The National Transportation Safety Board determined that the probable cause of the incident was as follows:

It was subsequently established that the engines needed to be run for at least 30 seconds with no O-rings fitted before an oil leak would become apparent.

Awards
Barnes, Boddy and Thompson were each presented with an Award for Outstanding Airmanship by the Airline Pilots Association.

Aftermath

The aircraft, N334EA, was later repaired and returned to service. The aircraft would later fly for Air Algerie in 1989, before being leased to American Trans Air that same year. Following Eastern Airlines ceasing operations in 1991, the aircraft would be transferred to Delta Air Lines, and re-registered as N788DL. The aircraft would later be transferred to Tradewinds Airlines in 1997, being registered as N826CR. The aircraft was later scrapped at Greensboro in March 2004.

References

Sources

External links
Airliners.net Photos of Eastern Air Lines Lockheed L-1011-385-1 TriStar aircraft
National Transportation Safety Board
Final report
Text version of final report – Prepared for World Wide Web usage by Hiroshi Sogame (十亀 洋 Sogame Hiroshi), a member of the Safety Promotion Committee (総合安全推進 Sōgō Anzen Suishin) of All Nippon Airways. (Archive)

Aviation accidents and incidents in the United States in 1983
1983 in Florida
855
Accidents and incidents involving the Lockheed L-1011
Airliner accidents and incidents caused by engine failure
Airliner accidents and incidents in Florida
May 1983 events in the United States